Croatian Music Channel, most commonly referred to only as CMC is a Croatian television channel broadcasting Croatian music and music of Croatian production.

It is available in cable television, DVB-T and satellite television.

The channel's purpose is, as its founders say, to promote and present Croatian music to the World. Currently CMC broadcasts in Europe, North America and Australia.

References

External links
 

Television channels in Croatia
Television channels in North Macedonia
Croatian popular music
Television channels and stations established in 2005
2005 establishments in Croatia
Mass media in Zagreb
Music television channels
Music organizations based in Croatia